Chipley is a city in and the county seat of Washington County, Florida, United States, located between Tallahassee and Pensacola. Its population was 3,605 in the 2010 U.S. Census. The area is served by Chipley High School.

Originally called "Orange", the city was renamed Chipley in 1882 for William Dudley Chipley, president of the Pensacola and Atlantic Railroad and Florida state senator from 1895 to 1897.

During the cold snap of January 1985, a temperature of 2 degrees was recorded at one of the town's golf courses, making it the second-coldest Florida temperature ever recorded and the lowest January reading for the state.

Geography

The city is located in the Florida Panhandle along Interstate 10 and U.S. Route 90. U.S. Route 90 runs through
the downtown area from west to east as Jackson Avenue, and leads east  to Cottondale and west  to Bonifay. Interstate 10 runs from west to east south of the city, with access from exit 120 (Florida State Road 77). I-10 leads east  to Tallahassee, the state capital, and west  to Pensacola. FL-77 is the main north–south route through the city, and leads north  to Graceville and south  to Panama City.

Climate

Demographics

As of the census of 2010, there were 3,605 people, 1,442 households, and 908 families residing in the city. The racial makeup of the city was 68.24% White, 26.85% African American, 0.80% Native American, 1.14% Asian, 0.08% Pacific Islander, 0.47% from other races, and 2.41% from two or more races. Hispanic or Latino people of any race were 2.94% of the population.

There were 1,442 households, out of which 28.4% had children under the age of 18 living with them, 40.2% were married couples living together, 19.3% had a female householder with no husband present, and 37.0% were non-families. Of all households 33.2% were made up of individuals, and 18.0% had someone living alone who was 65 years of age or older. The average household size was 2.33 and the average family size was 2.97.

In the city, the population was spread out, with 27.15% under the age of 18, 7.2% from 18 to 24, 24.5% from 25 to 44, 21.4% from 45 to 64, and 15.09% who were 65 years of age or older. The median age was 39 years. For every 100 females, there were 82.9 males. For every 100 females age 18 and over, there were 77.4 males.

The median income for a household in the city was $21,686, and the median income for a family was $28,792. Males had a median income of $23,715 versus $19,662 for females. The per capita income for the city was $12,842. About 25.1% of families and 27.7% of the population were below the poverty line, including 42.4% of those under age 18 and 22.3% of those age 65 or over.

Points of interest
 Washington County Courthouse
 Chipley City Hall
 Falling Waters State Park
 South Third Street Historic District
 Tri-County Airport
 Woman's Club of Chipley

Notable people

 Marcel Albert, French Air Ace and Hero of the Soviet Union; lived here
 Mary Lena Faulk, golfer who won the U.S. Amateur and several professional tournaments; born in Chipley
 Artis Gilmore, hall-of-fame professional basketball player; born in Chipley and attended Roulhac High School
 Amasa Coleman Lee, lawyer and legislator in Alabama
 Amp Lee, halfback at Florida State University and in the NFL 
 Will McLean "father of Florida folk fusic," The Black Hat Troubadour, Florida Artists Hall of Fame
 Cody Slate, tight end at Marshall University and in the NFL
 Bert Yancey, Professional Golfers Association player; born in Chipley
 Trent Forrest, professional basketball player for the Atlanta Hawks; grew up in Chipley.

Media
 The Washington County News
 Foster Folly News
 Chipley Bugle
 Investigator online newspaper

References

Further reading
Early History of Chipley

External links
 City of Chipley

Cities in Washington County, Florida
County seats in Florida
Cities in Florida